Weigel v Finanzlandesdirektion für Vorarlberg (2004) C-387/01 is an EU law case, concerning the free movement of workers in the European Union.

Facts
Mr Weigel got a job in Austria. He and his wife transferred their residence there. They brought their cars. Re-registration incurred a high tax charge. They claimed this breached TFEU art 45(2).

Judgment
The Court of Justice, Sixth Chamber, held the tax was justified.

See also

European Union law

Notes

References

Court of Justice of the European Union case law